John J. "Johnny Doc" Dougherty is a prominent labor leader in Philadelphia. As a leader within the Philadelphia organized labor scene, Dougherty is a prominent political figure who helps Democratic candidates get elected by directing donations and volunteers.

Early life and education
Dougherty grew up in the Pennsport section of South Philadelphia and graduated from St Joseph Prep in Philadelphia. He also briefly attended LaSalle University.

Career
In 2003, he was named to the PoliticsPA "Power 50" list of politically influential people in Pennsylvania. In 2003, he was named to the Pennsylvania Report “Power 75” List.  In 2010, Politics Magazine named him one of the most influential Democrats in Pennsylvania.

He had a famous and long-standing feud with former Senator Vince Fumo. The political website PoliticsPA likened the relationship to the Hatfield-McCoy feud During the 2008 Democratic primary for the 1st senatorial district in the Pennsylvania Senate in Philadelphia, Dougherty was dealt a surprising defeat by Larry Farnese, who was heavily supported by Fumo. Following Dougherty's concession, Fumo was heard chanting "Doc is dead! Doc is dead!"

As of March 2010 he was the Business Manager of Local 98 of the International Brotherhood of Electrical Workers.

In 2015, he endorsed former Philadelphia City Councilman Jim Kenney for Mayor of Philadelphia. His endorsement was a driving factor in his win in a crowded Democratic primary.

Legal issues

Federal indictments

In January 2019, Dougherty was indicted in an IBEW Local 98 investigation that charged him for misusing union funds for personal benefit and corrupting a public official, along with other related allegations. Dougherty has pleaded not guilty.

In November 2020, the federal judge overseeing the case ruled that the indictment would be split into separate trials. One trial will include all remaining defendants and cover the allegations of embezzlement and self-enrichment. The other trial (now finished) only included Dougherty and co-defendant Bobby Henon on charges of corruption, bribery, and honest services fraud. Since the indictment was filed, a number of Dougherty’s co-defendants have pleaded guilty.

In March 2021, Dougherty and a relative, Gregory Fiocca, were arrested and charged in another federal indictment with 19 counts of conspiracy and extortion. The U.S. Attorney’s Office has accused Dougherty and Fiocca of threatening a contractor “through force and violence, and threats of violence and economic harm”.

On November 15, 2021, Dougherty was convicted on charges of one count of conspiracy to commit fraud and seven counts of wire fraud. Dougherty maintains his innocence and intends to file an appeal. Shortly after the conviction due to Federal Labor Laws Dougherty announced his resignation as business manager of local 98 of the International Brotherhood of Electrical workers. He faces a maximum 20-year sentence. Sentencing is set for February. Dougherty faces a second trial on charges he and others embezzled more than $600,000 from IBEW Local 98.  [1] [19]

Department of Labor civil suit
In January 2021, following another FBI raid of IBEW Local 98 headquarters, the US Department of Labor filed a civil suit to nullify Dougherty’s most recent election as the union’s Business Manager. The suit alleges Dougherty and associates intimidated potential challengers to Dougherty and warned of reprisals should any contest the election, which took place after Dougherty’s 2019 federal indictment.

References
19.  https://6abc.com/amp/johnny-doc-resigns-ibew-local-98-philly-labor-union-john-dougherty/11242985/

Activists from Philadelphia
Political activists from Pennsylvania
Living people
International Brotherhood of Electrical Workers people
St. Joseph's Preparatory School alumni
La Salle University people
Pennsylvania Democrats
Year of birth missing (living people)